Allen Caldwell is one of currently seven directors of the Max Planck Institute for Physics. He became director in 2002.

References

Max Planck Society people
Living people
Year of birth missing (living people)
Place of birth missing (living people)
Max Planck Institute directors